On 7 July 2016, at least 56 people were killed and 75 injured after a group of attackers stormed the Mausoleum of Sayid Mohammed bin Ali al-Hadi, a Shia holy site in Balad, Iraq. The attackers included suicide car bombers, suicide bombers on foot, and several gunmen. They attacked Shia pilgrims celebrating Eid al-Fitr, which marks the end of the Muslim holy month of Ramadan. There were three suicide bombers, and one of them was killed by security personnel. There were other attackers too. ISIL also launched several mortars into the area.

The Islamic State of Iraq and the Levant carried out the attack, and claimed they killed over 100 people, which came shortly after a series of bomb attacks in Baghdad committed by ISIL that targeted Shias, killing at least 341 people and injuring over 246.

Background 
Four days before this attack, ISIL carried out the July 2016 Baghdad bombings, which constituted the deadliest single terror attack since the start of the Iraq War, killing at least 341 people. After that attack, an Iraqi official speaking to the Guardian predicted that the group's next target would be a Shia shrine, reflecting its "desperation".

The mausoleum is the resting place of Sayid Mohammed bin Ali al-Hadi, the son of Ali al-Hadi, the tenth Imam of The Twelve Imams. Therefore, it is a popular place for Shia pilgrims. Located at the shrine were many Shia pilgrims celebrating Eid al-Fitr, which marks the end of the Muslim holy month of Ramadan. The attack occurred during the Eid al-Fitr, when many pilgrims visit the site.

Attack 
Prior to the attack, ISIL launched several mortars into the area. After this, several attackers stormed the mausoleum using car suicide bombs, guns, and suicide belts or vests at around 23:00 (Iraqi time). There were three suicide bombers who attempted to run inside the mausoleum with the goal of blowing themselves up, killing civilians. One suicide bomber was shot by policemen before blowing himself up. A second bomber made his way inside the shrine and allegedly was able to blow himself up. The third bomber was stopped from entering the shrine after being hugged by a civilian, instead detonating his suicide vest outside of the gate near police officers. "At least 20 militants" then took over the shrine for half an hour, clashing with security while reinforcements arrived, killing at least seven. It is unknown whether or not any of the other attackers were killed or arrested. The fire caused by the bombing also heavily damaged the marketplace next to the compound.

The death toll of the attack was 56 with over 75 people injured, some critically. ISIL claimed that they killed over 100 people. They allegedly purposely targeted the Shias at the shrine.

Aftermath

Najih Shaker Al-Baldawi
The man who was killed after stopping a suicide bomber from entering the shrine was named as Najih Shaker Al-Baldawi. He hugged one of the suicide bombers and thus mitigated the impact of the explosion of the suicide vest. Al-Baldawi, a local resident of Balad, likely saved dozens from death and injury. He was described as a "hero" by many after what he did gained popularity online.

Reactions
Following the bombing, Shia cleric Muqtada al-Sadr deployed his militia to guard the shrine. The town went into a lockdown as other potential attackers were searched by the police.

Iraqi Defence Minister Khalid Al-Obeidi describe the attack as a "security failure". The Iraqi Prime Minister Haider al-Abadi also fired three his head of security after the bombing.

Sheikh Abu Salam Saede, a tribal leader from Balad, interpreted the bombing as an attempt to restart sectarian violence caused by ISIL's defeat at Fallujah eight days prior, and blamed the Saudi ambassador. Mustafa al-Sufi, a resident of Balad, reported that some residents blamed Sunnis and internally displaced Sunni Iraqis for inciting the bombing. However, the Guardian commented that the "toxic heights" of 2006, when sectarian conflict was ignited after the al-Askari mosque bombing had not yet been reached, a view shared by al-Sufi, as "political leaders and tribal figures [...] asked for citizens to put their faith in the government to stop the attacks".

Ján Kubiš, the Special Representative and Head of the United Nations Assistance Mission in Iraq, released a statement saying "It is clear the cowardly attack on the shrine aims to spark sectarian tensions and drag Iraq back to the dark days of sectarian conflict. With the people’s awareness and unity, the terrorists' goals will not be achieved."

See also
 List of Islamist terrorist attacks
 List of terrorist incidents, July–December 2016
 Terrorist incidents in Iraq in 2016

References

2016 murders in Iraq
21st-century mass murder in Iraq
2010s in Baghdad
ISIL terrorist incidents in Iraq
Islamic terrorist incidents in 2016
Mass murder in 2016
Massacres in 2016
2016-07
Terrorist incidents in Iraq in 2016
Violence against Shia Muslims in Iraq
July 2016 crimes in Asia
Balad, Iraq
Attacks on buildings and structures in Iraq